Los Locos, also known as Los Locos: Posse Rides Again, is a 1997 Western film directed by Jean-Marc Vallée, written by and starring Mario Van Peebles. It also stars Melora Walters, René Auberjonois, and Danny Trejo.

Plot
During the 1800s in the Wild West, a gunman by the name of Chance is hired to escort emotionally challenged people across the desert safely.

Production
The film was originally conceived as an independently-assembled project by writer/producer Van Peebles. After completion, Polygram, who had previously released Posse to moderate success, acquired the film for home video release, and in most territories sold it as a sequel even though it had no ties to the film and Van Peebles plays a character unrelated to his role in the earlier film.

References

External links 
 
 

1997 films
Canadian independent films
1997 Western (genre) films
Films directed by Jean-Marc Vallée
Films scored by Lesley Barber
Canadian Western (genre) films
English-language Canadian films
1997 independent films
1990s English-language films
1990s Canadian films